Do It — One! is a 1990 Soviet military drama film directed by Andrei Malyukov.

Plot
Alexei Gavrilov goes to serve in the Soviet military. At the recruiting station he is shoved by Sergeant Shipov. Alexei stops him and demands an apology. A conflict arises between them and Shipov begins harboring resentment towards Gavrilov.

Shipov learns that Gavrilov will go to serve in the marines. Shipov begs the officer of the Marine Corps, who came to the recruiting station to get new recruits, to transfer the personal file of conscript Gavrilov to his officer, inventing the reason that Gavrilov is his countryman. As a result, instead of serving in the Marine Corps, Gavrilov falls into the service of a motorized rifle regiment where Shipov serves.

Alexei is in the part where dedovshchina (hazing) runs rampant. The "grandfathers" force the recruits to carry out their economic work, mock them, steal money from them at night. Immediately after arriving at the section, Shipov forces the "young" to do push-ups and explains to them the "main points" of hazing. But Alexei does not want to obey brute force. In the section he meets Ivan Botsu and they become friends.

During a skirmish in the dining room, Sergeant Stepanov defends Gavrilov and other recruits. During dismissal, five unknown people attack Stepanov and beat him. And later Shipov threatens Stepanov with a disciplinary battalion if he continues to interfere with him.

The "grandfathers" order the rank-and-file Botsu to count the days before the demobilization. Botsu refuses, and then "grandfathers" carry out a vile provocation in revenge - corporal Kabanov steals money from one of the "skulls" and plants it in the jacket of Botsu. On examination Shipov takes out money from Boets's tunic in view of everyone thereby setting everyone else against him. At night, several "skulls" grab Ivan and drag him into the boiler room. This is seen by Stepanov, but, remembering the threats of Shipov, he is idle. In the boiler room Ivan is brutally beaten and humiliated. Gavrilov, coming to the barracks, does not find his friend and understands that something is wrong. He tries to find Ivan and gets into the boiler room. There Alexei is also beaten. Suddenly Sergeant Shipov appears and orders everyone to disperse. Botsu attempts to commit suicide, but Alexei stops him. Realizing that he has no other way out, Gavrilov steals a machine gun from the weapons cabinet. An alarm is raised. The entire personnel runs to the boiler room. Gavrilov appears with the weapon in his hands and makes the "grandfathers" do push-ups, and orders Shipov to do them faster than others. Alarm is raised. The guard raised due to the alarm, tries to break into the boiler room. Gavrilov, upon hearing this puts the machine gun on the floor and goes towards the exit.

Cast
Yevgeny Mironov - Private Alexei Gavrilov
Vladimir Mashkov - Sergeant Anatoly Shipov
Alexei Burykin - Private Ivan Botsu
Aleksandr Domogarov - Junior Sergeant Gosh
Sergey Shentalinsky - Sergeant Stepanov
Alexander Mironov - corporal Kabanov
Alexander Polkov - Artemiev
Vladimir Smirnov - Private
Oleg Alexandrov - Private, senior officer
Andrei Fomin - Private Eremenko
Igor Marchenko - Private, senior officer
Fedor Smirnov - Captain Filipenko
Valeriy Troshin - Private, one of the "skulls"
Dmitry Orlov - Private Siyazov
Alexander Inshakov - ringleader of hooligans (also stuntman of the film)
Igor Artashonov - Platoon Commander
Eugene Mundum - Senior Sergeant

Production and release
The Soviet ministry of defense attempted to prevent Do It — One! from getting made because of the film's portrayal of dedovshchina.
The picture was not shown on television and was only screened "underground".

References

External links
 

Soviet drama films
Films about military personnel
Military of Russia in films
Mosfilm films
Films directed by Andrei Malyukov
1990 drama films
1990 films
1990s Russian-language films